Wien Wolf in der Au is a railway station serving Penzing, the fourteenth district of Vienna.

See also 

Rail transport in Austria

References 

Railway stations in Vienna
Austrian Federal Railways
Railway stations in Europe